Erik Jendresen is an American author, playwright, screenwriter and producer of plays, television, and film. Previous projects include Killing Lincoln, co-produced with Tony and Ridley Scott for the National Geographic Channel; a series based on the Francis Ford Coppola film, The Conversation (with Christopher McQuarrie); The Pony Express (with Robert Duvall); an eight-hour adaptation of Gregory Maguire's novel, Wicked (ABC); an eight-hour miniseries Majestic-12; and The Command - a series set in the world of the Joint Special Operations Command (FIC).

Career
As co-creator, lead writer and a supervising producer of the critically acclaimed mini-series Band of Brothers for HBO in 2001, Jendresen was one of the recipients of that year's Emmy Award for "Outstanding Miniseries", which he shared with Tom Hanks and Steven Spielberg, among others. Jendresen also shared an Emmy nomination for that show in the category of "Outstanding Writing for a Miniseries, Movie or a Dramatic Special". The show also resulted in a Golden Globe Award for "Best Mini-Series or Motion Picture Made for Television", and 20 other awards, including the Peabody Award.

As a writer/ producer for film, his current projects include The Mariner (directed by Christopher McQuarrie for FOX); Mission: Blacklist (directed by Rodrigo Cortés); Saint-Ex (directed by Christopher McQuarrie); Aloft (starring Robert Redford); Solo (directed by Antonio Banderas); and an adaptation of Walter Tevis's The Man Who Fell to Earth (directed by David Slade).  Earlier film projects include Star Trek: The Beginning (Paramount), Sublime, starring Tom Cavanagh and Kathleen York, Otis and The Big Bang (starring Antonio Banderas and Sam Elliott), and Ithaca - an adaptation of William Saroyan's The Human Comedy (directed by Meg Ryan and starring Sam Shepard and Hamish Linklater).

As a writer, producer, and showrunner for television, his current projects include Special, a series based on the documentary filmmakers of the 1960s (with Marti Noxon, for the National Geographic Channel); a series based on the stories of the French Foreign Legion (with Thomas Bidegain and Dimitri Rassam); The War, a five-season series about the unending interconnected conflicts of the 20th century (with Christopher McQuarrie); The 43, a six-hour mini-series about WWII British ex-servicemen fighting fascism on their home soil (BBC/NBC); A Coloured Man's Reminiscences, an eight-hour miniseries chronicling the story of James Madison’s slave, Paul Jennings (with Tyger Williams and Rodrigo Garcia, for ABC); Castner's Cutthroats, a six-hour miniseries about the Battle of the Aleutians (Discovery Channel); Rocket Men, a ten-hour miniseries about Wernher von Braun and the men who took us to the moon and beyond; Climb to Conquer, a ten-hour miniseries about the 10th Mountain Division in World War II (with Wildwood); and Shot All to Hell, a four-hour miniseries about the James-Younger Gang and the Northfield, Minnesota, raid (TNT).

Jendresen also has to his credit several books, most of which deal with the socio-anthropology of Peru and the Amazon Basin, including Dance of the Four Winds and its sequel, Island of the Sun (both based upon the journals of and co-written with Alberto Villoldo), and the children's book, The First Story Ever Told (also with Villoldo).  Hanuman (with Joshua M. Greene, and Li Ming) is a re-telling for children of a portion of the Ramayana.

Jendresen is currently co-writing the upcoming films Mission: Impossible - Dead Reckoning Part One and Mission: Impossible - Dead Reckoning Part Two with director Christopher McQuarrie. 

He is also a playwright (The Killing of Michael Malloy, Excuse My Dust, Malice Aforethought).

Personal life
Jendresen lives in Sausalito, California, aboard the M.V. Hindeloopen, 112-year-old riveted wrought iron vessel which saw service during the evacuation of Dunkirk in 1940. He is married to Venus Madora Aslee Bobis, Program Director of the Partial Hospitalization Program at Langley Porter Psychiatric Institute of the University of California, San Francisco, and his partner in Pilothouse Pictures.

He is an advisor at the Sundance Screenwriters Lab.

References

External links

Interview with IGN Film Force
"Band of Brothers" at TV Tome.
"Killing Lincoln" Interview with Indiewire.com

Year of birth missing (living people)
Living people
21st-century American screenwriters
21st-century American male writers
American dramatists and playwrights
American male dramatists and playwrights
American male screenwriters
American television writers